Johannes Brandt (1884–1955) was an Austrian screenwriter and film director.

Selected filmography

Screenwriter
 Diamonds (1920)
 The Three Dances of Mary Wilford (1920)
 The Call of Destiny (1922)
 Felicitas Grolandin (1923)
 King of Women (1923)
 The Clever Fox (1926)
 Trude (1926)
 Excluded from the Public (1927)
 Women on the Edge (1929)
 The White Roses of Ravensberg (1929)
 The Flute Concert of Sanssouci (1930)
 The Prosecutor Hallers (1930)
 The Other (1930)
 The Song of the Nations (1931)
 The Street Song (1931)
 Hooray, It's a Boy! (1931)
 This One or None (1932)
 Gitta Discovers Her Heart (1932)
 Under False Flag (1932)
 The Hymn of Leuthen (1933)

Director
 Der Fahnenträger von Sedan (1927)

Bibliography
 Jung, Uli & Schatzberg, Walter. Beyond Caligari: The Films of Robert Wiene. Berghahn Books, 1999.

External links

1884 births
1955 deaths
20th-century Austrian screenwriters
20th-century Austrian male writers
Austrian male screenwriters
Film people from Vienna